Ajeeb was a chess-playing "automaton", created by Charles Hooper (a cabinet maker), first presented at the Royal Polytechnical Institute in 1868.  A piece of faux mechanical technology (while presented as entirely automated, it in fact concealed a strong human chess player inside), it drew scores of thousands of spectators to its games, the opponents for which included Harry Houdini, Theodore Roosevelt, and O. Henry.

Ajeeb's name was derived from the Arabic word  meaning "wonderful, marvelous." The genius behind the device were players such as Harry Nelson Pillsbury (1898–1904), Albert Beauregard Hodges, Constant Ferdinand Burille, Charles Moehle, and Charles Francis Barker. Moehle, for instance, gained further popularity playing chess in the United States, where the contraption was also exhibited in the Eden Museum in 1885 and Coney Island in 1915. Solomon Lipschuetz was one of Ajeeb's notable opponents during this period. The machine also played checkers, matching against figures such as 1920s American champ Sam Gonotsky, who would also direct the machine under the ownership of Hattie Elmore.

In the history of such devices, it succeeded the Mechanical Turk and preceded Mephisto.

References 

History of chess
Chess automatons
1868 in chess
19th-century robots
19th-century hoaxes